Aberdeen station, otherwise known as the Minneapolis and St. Louis Railroad Depot in Aberdeen, South Dakota was built by the Minneapolis and St. Louis Railway (or M&StL) in the early 1900s and opened for service on September 1, 1907.

The depot is a one and one-half story rectangular brick building with a one story bay window on the south wall.

The Minneapolis and St. Louis Railroad began laying tracks into Aberdeen in 1906, and the first passenger train, the Aberdeen Limited, arrived on September 1, 1907. Passenger service to the station lasted until 1949. In 1968, the old station became the Depot Club. In 2016, the station was renovated and became an architecture office.

References
 French, Edith. Minneapolis and St. Louis Railroad Depot (Brown County, South Dakota) National Register of Historic Places Inventory-Nomination Form, 1976. On file at the National Park Service.

Railway stations on the National Register of Historic Places in South Dakota
Aberdeen, South Dakota
Railway stations in the United States opened in 1907
1907 establishments in South Dakota
Buildings and structures in Aberdeen, South Dakota
National Register of Historic Places in Brown County, South Dakota
Railway stations closed in 1949
Former railway stations in South Dakota